A Giuga number is a composite number n such that for each of its distinct prime factors pi we have , or equivalently such that for each of its distinct prime factors pi we have . 

The Giuga numbers are named after the mathematician Giuseppe Giuga, and relate to his conjecture on primality.

Definitions 
Alternative definition for a Giuga number due to Takashi Agoh is:  a composite number n is a Giuga number if and only if the congruence

 

An equivalent formulation due to Giuseppe Giuga is:  a composite number n is a Giuga number if and only if the congruence

and if and only if

All known Giuga numbers n in fact satisfy the stronger condition

Examples 
The sequence of Giuga numbers begins

30, 858, 1722, 66198, 2214408306, 24423128562, 432749205173838, … .

For example, 30 is a Giuga number since its prime factors are 2, 3 and 5, and we can verify that

 30/2 - 1 = 14, which is divisible by 2,
 30/3 - 1 = 9, which is 3 squared, and
 30/5 - 1 = 5, the third prime factor itself.

Properties 
The prime factors of a Giuga number must be distinct.

Thus, only square-free integers can be Giuga numbers.  For example, the factors of 60 are 2, 2, 3 and 5, and 60/2 - 1 = 29, which is not divisible by 2. Thus, 60 is not a Giuga number.

This rules out squares of primes, but semiprimes cannot be Giuga numbers either. For if , with  primes, then
, so  will not divide , and thus  is not a Giuga number.

All known Giuga numbers are even. If an odd Giuga number exists, it must be the product of at least 14 primes. It is not known if there are infinitely many Giuga numbers.

It has been conjectured by Paolo P. Lava (2009) that Giuga numbers are the solutions of the differential equation n' = n+1, where n'  is the arithmetic derivative of n.

José Mª Grau and Antonio Oller-Marcén have shown that an integer n is a  Giuga number if and only if it satisfies n' = a n + 1 for some integer a > 0, where n'  is the arithmetic derivative of n. (Again, n' = a n + 1 is identical to the third equation in Definitions, multiplied by n.)

See also
Carmichael number
Primary pseudoperfect number

References
 
 
 

Integer sequences
Unsolved problems in number theory